Lakeland Christian Academy is a private school in Cold Lake, Alberta, Canada. It is affiliated with Harvest Life Victory Church.

External links
Official site

Private schools in Alberta
Cold Lake, Alberta
Educational institutions in Canada with year of establishment missing